Emiter (мак. Емитер) is a Macedonian magazine for the popularization of science. The website of the magazine was launched in 2009.

References

External links

1995 establishments in the Republic of Macedonia
Magazines published in North Macedonia
Magazines established in 1995
Popular science magazines
Science and technology magazines
Macedonian-language magazines